Martin Colin Sacks (born 16 October 1959) is an Australian actor who is chiefly known for his 12-year role on Blue Heelers from 1993 to 2005.

Life and career
Sacks was born in Sydney. He got into acting after a bit part in an episode of The Love Boat when it was filming in the Pacific. His first role came about in the series The Restless Years in the early 1980s, which started him on the television circuit in Australia. He emigrated to Hollywood in the 1980s, guest starring in series such as thirtysomething, but preferred Australia, and so he returned there after a few years. Also had guest appearances in: Love in Limbo, Encounters, Irresistible Force, Fields of Fire III, All the Way, Touch the Sun: Princess Kate, Slate, Wyn & Me, Tricheuse, La, Emoh Ruo, Stock Squad and The City's Edge. Also Jake & The Fatman.

Sacks took the role of Detective P.J. Hasham in the 1993 series Blue Heelers. The show rocketed him to fame, most notably his 7-year "will-they-or-won't-they" relationship with Constable Maggie Doyle (Lisa McCune) which ended with her death in the programme's seventh season.

During the time he starred on the show, Sacks married Kate and had two children, Jack and Ned and had leading roles in two major Australian miniseries: Do or Die and My Husband My Killer (both 2001).

After playing P.J. for twelve years, and being one of only three original cast still on the show in the twelfth season, Sacks left Blue Heelers in August 2005. Sacks asked the producers not to kill his character, so that he could return for a guest spot in the future. He did not get the chance, however: the show was cancelled in early 2006.

Sacks is also a director, having directed episodes of Blue Heelers, All Saints and a short film called Crushed.

Sacks also starred in the 2008 Australian TV hit, Underbelly, portraying underworld loanshark Mario Condello. In 2010, Sacks guest starred in three different shows – City Homicide, Rescue: Special Ops and Sea Patrol. In 2013 he appeared in Wentworth.

Filmography

As actor

As director

Awards

References

External links 

1959 births
Australian male film actors
Australian male television actors
Living people
Logie Award winners
Male actors from Sydney
20th-century Australian male actors
21st-century Australian male actors